The Palais de la Bourse or Palais du Commerce is a building located in the quarter Les Cordeliers, in 2nd arrondissement of Lyon. It currently houses the headquarters of the Chamber of Commerce and Industry of Lyon. It is served by the metro station Cordeliers, and by bus lines C3,13, 18, 23, 25, 28, 58, 71, 91 and 99.

It is bordered by the place des Cordeliers to the south, the place de la Bourse to the north, the Rue de la République to the west and Rue de la Bourse to the east.

In 1994, the building was classified as a monument historique.

History

In 1853, the construction of the Palais du Commerce was decided, composing of a museum of art and industry, shops, the company of change agents and brokers in silk, the Chamber of Commerce and the Commercial Court. On 4 August 1854, René Dardel, architect of the Pont La Feuillée, the covered halls located  Rue de la Martinière, and the creation of the Rue Victor Hugo, was chosen by prefect of the Rhône Claude-Marius Vaïsse for the construction of the building.

The construction started in 1856 and the first stone was laid on 15 March. The building was inaugurated by Napoleon III and Empress Eugenie on 25 August 1860.

On 24 June 1894, president Sadi Carnot was assassinated leaving the building by the anarchist Caserio under the windows located on the rue de la République.

Architecture
The dimensions of the building are: 56.6 meters and 64.5 meters. It is composed of four corner pavilions and a central hall, called "Salle de la Corbeille".

The decoration of the building, both in its facades that its interior, reflects the destination of the building : the statues of Justice, the Temperance, Agriculture, Trade and Industry. The group around the clock on the facade is the work of Jean-Marie Bonnassieux.  The exterior white marble statue, near the stairs and the Place des Cordeliers, is an allegory that personified Saône and Rhône joining their arms to point to the future. It was made in 1905 by sculptor Wermar.

The two fronts at north and south are richly decorated with many entablatures, balconies and columns. Most paintings of interior ceilings are the work of artists from Lyon such as Antoine Claude Ponthus-Cinier or Jean-Baptiste Beuchot.

Uses
Initially devoted to host many institutions, the Palais de la Bourse, now Chamber of Commerce and Industry of Lyon hosted :
 The Commercial Court
 The Company of brokers in silk and goods, until 1867
 The Employment Tribunal held its meetings until 1927
 The Crédit Lyonnais, until 1934.

Photos

References

 De la rue Impériale à la rue de la République, Archives municipales de Lyon, 1991

Buildings and structures in Lyon
Renaissance Revival architecture
2nd arrondissement of Lyon
Palaces in France
Monuments historiques of Lyon
World Heritage Sites in France